The siege of Landau may refer to any of several sieges of the fortress city of Landau, located in Rhineland-Palatinate, Germany:
 Siege of Landau (1702), during the War of the Spanish Succession
 Siege of Landau (1703), during the War of the Spanish Succession
 Siege of Landau (1704), during the War of the Spanish Succession
 Siege of Landau (1713), during the War of the Spanish Succession
 Siege of Landau (1793), during the French Revolutionary Wars

Sieges